Juan María de la Cruz, S.C.I. (born Mariano García Méndez, San Esteban de los Patos, Province of Ávila, 25 September 1891 – Silla, Valencia, 23 August 1936) was a Spanish Roman Catholic priest.

The Roman Catholic Church considers him a martyr. He was beatified by Pope John Paul II in 2001, together with his fellow martyrs killed in the Spanish Civil War.

References

External links

 Celebration at St Peter's Square 

1891 births
1936 deaths
People from the Province of Ávila
20th-century Spanish Roman Catholic priests
Spanish beatified people
Martyred Roman Catholic priests
Martyrs of the Spanish Civil War
People executed by Spain by firing squad
Beatifications by Pope John Paul II